Outdoor USA Magazine is a paper and online trade publication for the North American outdoor industry. The magazine is distributed to outdoor retailers, manufacturers, sales representatives and other industry stakeholders. As a trade publication it reports on news relevant to its industry. It is published on a monthly basis.

References

Business magazines published in the United States
Monthly magazines published in the United States
Magazines with year of establishment missing
Professional and trade magazines